Sociedade Esportiva Veneciano, commonly known as Veneciano, is a Brazilian football club based in Nova Venécia, Espírito Santo state.

History
The club was founded on June 14, 2001, after the merger of Leão de São Marcos Esporte Clube, Associação Atlética Nova Venécia and Veneciano Futebol Clube. They finished in the second position in the Campeonato Capixaba Second Level in 2001, losing the competition to Tupy.

Stadium
Sociedade Esportiva Veneciano play their home games at Estádio Zenor Pedrosa Rocha. The stadium has a maximum capacity of 2,000 people.

References

Association football clubs established in 2001
Football clubs in Espírito Santo
2001 establishments in Brazil